Force XXI or Force 21 may refer to:
Force 21 (video game), a 1999 real-time strategy game made by Red Storm Entertainment
Force XXI Battle Command Brigade and Below, a military communications project
Transformation of the United States Army, at the start of the 21st century